Paepalanthus is a genus of plants in the family Eriocaulaceae. It has about 300-400 species, native mostly to tropical Africa and Latin America, with a few species in Japan and Madagascar.

Selected species
Paepalanthus bromelioides 
Paepalanthus celsus

References

Further reading
 

Eriocaulaceae